The 24th General Assembly of Nova Scotia represented Nova Scotia between 1867 and 1871.

John J. Marshall was chosen as speaker for the house. Jared C. Troop was named speaker in February 1870 after Marshall's death.

The assembly was dissolved on April 17, 1871.

List of Members 

Notes:

References 
 

Terms of the General Assembly of Nova Scotia
1867 establishments in Nova Scotia
1871 disestablishments in Nova Scotia
19th century in Nova Scotia